This is a list of lakes of Ontario beginning with the letter A.

A–Ab
A Lake
Aaron Lake (Timiskaming District)
Aaron Lake (Kenora District)
Abamasagi Lake
Abamategwia Lake
Abams Lake
Abate Lake
Abazotikichuan Lake
Abbe Lake
Abbess Lake
Abbey Lake
Abbie Lake
Abbotsford Lake
Abbott Lake (Sudbury District)
Abbott Lake (Kenora District)
Abbott Lake (Frontenac County)
Abbott Lake (Rainy River District)
Abelson Lake
Aber Lake
Abernethy Lake
Abes Lake
Abie Lake
Abigogami Lake
Abimatinu Lake
Abinette Lake
Lake Abitibi
Abney Lake
Abram Lake (Kenora District)
Abram Lake (Cochrane District)
Abs Lake

Ac
Acanthus Lake
Ace Lake (Thunder Bay District)
Ace Lake (Sudbury District)
Acer Lake
Achapi Lake
Acheson Lake (Rainy River District)
Acheson Lake (Sudbury District)
Achigan Lake
Acid Lake
Acker Lake
Ackerman Lake
Acme Lake (Algoma District)
Acme Lake (Nipissing District)
Acolyte Lake
Aconda Lake
Acorn Lake
Acre Lake
Acton Lake
Acton Pond

Ad
Ada Lake (Muskoka District)
Ada Lake (Sudbury District)
Ada Lake (Thunder Bay District)
Adagio Lake
Adair Lake (Kenora District)
Adair Lake (Adrian Township, Thunder Bay District)
Adair Lake (Sound Creek, Thunder Bay District)
Adam Lake
Adamac Lake
Adamhay Lake
Adams Lake (Muskoka District)
Adams Lake (Lanark County)
Adams Lake (Renfrew County)
Adams Lake (Sudbury District)
Adams Lake (Haliburton County)
Adamson Lake (Timiskaming District)
Adamson Lake (Kenora District)
Adanac Lake
Add Lake
Addie Lake
Addington Lake
Addison Lake (Thunder Bay District)
Addison Lake (Sudbury District)
Adel Lake
Adelaide Lake (Sudbury District)
Adelaide Lake (Algoma District)
Adelard Lake
Adele Lake
Adik Lake
Adios Lake
Admiral Lake
Admit Lake
Adobe Lake
Adrian Lake
Adrienne Lake
Adventure Lake
Adze Lake

Ae–Af
Aegean Lake
Aerial Lake (Kenora District)
Aerial Lake (Thunder Bay District)
Aerobus Lake
Aerofoil Lake
Aeroplane Lake
Affleck Lake (Kenora District)
Affleck Lake (Sudbury District)
A-frame Lake

Ag
Agam Lake
Agar Lake
Agassiz Lake
Agate Lake (Peterborough County)
Agate Lake (Thunder Bay District)
Agate Lake (Cochrane District)
Agawa Lake
Agawa Station Lake
Agimak Lake
Agnes Lake (Rainy River District)
Agnes Lake (Parry Sound District)
Agnew Lake (Sudbury District)
Agnew Lake (Kenora District)
Agonzon Lake
Agreen Lake
Aguasabon Lake
Ague Lake
Agusada Lake
Agusk Lake
Agutua Lake

Ah–Ai
Ahdik Lake
Ahern Lake
Ahmabel Lake
Ahme Lake
Ahmic Lake
Ahsine Lake
Aiabewatik Lake
Aide Lake
Aikens Lake
Aikman Lake
Aileen Lake
Ainslie Lake
Air Hole Lake
Aird Lake
Airplane Lake (Sudbury District)
Airplane Lake (Algoma District)
Airport Lake (Algoma District)
Airport Lake (Thunder Bay District)
Airstrip Lake
Airy Lake
Aitken Lake (Algoma District)
Aitken Lake (Cochrane District)

Aj–Ak
Ajax Lake
Akandamo Lakes
Akebia Lake
Akey Lake
Aki Lake
Akin Lakes
Akonesi Lake
Akonewi Lake
Akow Lake
Akron Lakes
Akweskwa Lake

Al
Alabama Lake
Alaska's Lake
Alba Lake
Albert Lake (Kenora District)
Albert Lake (Algoma District)
Albert Lake (Lahontan Township, Thunder Bay District)
Albert Lake (Fleming Township, Rainy River District)
Albert Lake (Burntside Lake, Rainy River District)
Albert Lake (Arnott Lake, Thunder Bay District)
Albert Lake (Gzowski Township, Thunder Bay District)
Albert Lake (Renfrew County)
Alberta Lake
Albion Lake
Alces Lake
Alco Lake
Alcock Lake
Alcona Lake
Alcorn Lake
Alden Lake (Martel Township, Algoma District)
Alden Lake (Corbriere Township, Algoma District)
Alder Lake (Peterborough County)
Alder Lake (Waterloo Region)
Alder Lake (Kenora District)
Alder Lake (Nipissing District)
Aldon Lake
Aldous Lake
Aldred Lake
Aldridge Lake
Ale Lake
Aleck Lake
Alex Lake (Algoma District)
Alex Lake (Kenora District)
Alex Lake (Cochrane District)
Alexander Lake (Nipissing District)
Alexander Lake (Hughson Township, Algoma District)
Alexander Lake (Kenora District)
Alexander Lake (Cochrane District)
Alexander Lake (Duncan Township, Algoma District)
Alexander Lake (Sudbury District)
Alexander Lake (Timiskaming District)
Alexandra Lake
Alexandre Lake
Alexis Lake
Alf Lake (Laughren Township, Algoma District)
Alf Lake (Marjorie Township, Algoma District)
Alfes Lake
Alford Lake (Morah Lake, Kenora District)
Alford Lake (Graves Township, Kenora District)
Alfred Lake (Kenora District)
Alfred Lake (Nipissing District)
Alfred Lake (Thunder Bay District)
Alfreda Lake
Alga Lake
Algocen Lake
Algonquin Lake
Alguire Lake
Alice Lake (Kenora District)
Alice Lake (Dickson Township, Nipissing District)
Alice Lake (Ashley Township, Algoma District)
Alice Lake (Greater Sudbury)
Alice Lake (Timiskaming District)
Alice Lake (Rainy River District)
Alice Lake (Leclaire Township, Algoma District)
Alice Lake (Gaudry Township, Algoma District)
Alice Lake (Hartle Township, Nipissing District)
Alice Lake (Sudbury District)
Alike Lake
Alister Lake
Aljo Lake
Alkenore Lake
Allan Lake (Rowan Lake, Kenora District)
Allan Lake (Temagami)
Allan Lake (Clifford Township, Cochrane District)
Allan Lake (Fitzgerald Township, Nipissing District)
Allan Lake (Rainy River District)
Allan Lake (Thunder Bay District)
Allan Lake (Neely Township, Cochrane District)
Allan Lake (Sioux Lookout)
Allan Lake (McEachern Lake, Cochrane District)
Allan Park Trout Pond
Allard Lake (Olink Lake, Thunder Bay District)
Allard Lake (Algoma District)
Allard Lake (Seseganaga Lake, Thunder Bay District)
Allbright Lake
Allely Lake
Allen Lake (Rainy River District)
Allen Lake (Killarney)
Allen Lake (Riggs Township, Algoma District)
Allen Lake (Hughson Township, Algoma District)
Allen Lake (Corbiere Township, Algoma District)
Allen Lake (Haliburton County)
Allen Lake (Blind River)
Allen Lake (Hastings County)
Allen Lake (Cunningham Township, Sudbury District)
Allen Lakes
Allenby Lake
Allens Lakes
Alligator Lake
Allin Lake (Sudbury District)
Allin Lake (Kenora District)
Allison Lake
Allumette Lake
Alluring Lake
Alm Lake
Alma Lake (Thunder Bay District)
Alma Lake (Timiskaming District)
Alma Lake (Sudbury District)
Alma Lake (Algoma District)
Almo Lake
Almon Lake
Almonte Lake
Alonghill Lake
Alph Lake
Alpha Lake (Athelstane Creek, Thunder Bay District)
Alpha Lake (Algoma District)
Alpha Lake (Dwight Lake, Thunder Bay District)
Alpha Lake (Sudbury District)
Alpine Lake (Algoma District)
Alpine Lake (Cochrane District)
Alport Lake
Alsever Lake
Alston Lake (Sudbury District)
Alston Lake (Kenora District)
Altar Lake
Altimeter Lake
Altitude Lake
Alto Lake
Alton Lake
Alva Lake
Alvin Lake
Alwyn Lake

Am
Amable Lakes
Amaleen Lake
Amanda Lake
Ambrose Lake (Thunder Bay District)
Ambrose Lake (Algoma District)
Amelia Lake (Algoma District)
Amelia Lake (Sudbury District)
Ameliasburg Mill Pond
American Cabin Lake
Ames Lake
Amesdale Lake
Ameson Lake
Amethyst Lake
Amik Lake (Algoma District)
Amik Lake (Rainy River District)
Amik Lake (Cochrane District)
Amik Lake (Max Creek, Thunder Bay District)
Amik Lake (Kenora District)
Amik Lake (Greenstone)
Amikeus Lake
Amikogaming Lake
Amikougami Lake
Amlin Lake
Amoeba Lake
Amos Lake (Thunder Bay District)
Amos Lake (Sudbury District)
Amos Lake (Timiskaming District)
Amp Lake
Amra Lake
Amwri Lake
Amy Lake (Sudbury District)
Amy Lake (Algoma District)
Amylou Lake
Amyoa Lake

An
Ana Lake
Anahareo Lake
Anape Lake
Anaway Lake
Anchor Lake (Rainy River District)
Anchor Lake (Kenora District)
Anchor Lake (Cochrane District)
Anchor Lake (Sudbury District)
Ancliff Lake
Anders Lake
Andersen Lake
Anderson Lake (Tolstoi Township, Cochrane District)
Anderson Lake (Favell Lake, Cochrane District)
Anderson Lake (Nipissing District)
Anderson Lake (Sturgeon Lake, Thunder Bay District)
Anderson Lake (Sudbury District)
Anderson Lake (Wawa)
Anderson Lake (Timiskaming District)
Anderson Lake (Black River-Matheson)
Anderson Lake (St. Ignace Island, Thunder Bay District)
Anderson Lake (Kwetabohigan River, Cochrane District)
Anderson Lake (Frost Township, Algoma District)
Anderson Lake (Shuniah)
Anderson Lake (Anderson Township, Algoma District)
Anderson Lake (MacFie Township, Kenora District)
Anderson Lake (Haliburton County)
Anderson Lake (Anderson Creek, Kenora District)
Anderson Lake (Lanark County)
Anderson Lake (Grey County)
Anderson Lake (Ontario–Manitoba)
Anderson Pond
Andre Lake
Andress Lake
Andrew Lake (Cochrane District)
Andrew Lake (Lanark County)
Andrews Lake (Colquhoun Township, Cochrane District)
Andrews Lake (Sudbury District)
Andrews Lake (Rainy River District)
Andrews Lake (Kawartha Lakes)
Andrews Lake (McCool Township, Cochrane District)
Androsace Lake
Andy Lake (Lang Lake, Kenora District)
Andy Lake (Thunder Bay District)
Andy Lake (Timiskaming District)
Andy Lake (Sudbury District)
Andy Lake (Sioux Narrows-Nestor Falls)
Andy Thompson Lake
Anelia Lake
Anenimus Lake
Aneroid Lake
Angekum Lake
Angel Lake (Stewart Creek, Thunder Bay District)
Angel Lake (Muskoka District)
Angel Lake (Tuuri Township, Thunder Bay District)
Angela Lake
Angelina Lake
Anger Lake
Angle Lake (Algoma District)
Angle Lake (Thunder Bay District)
Angle Lake (Sudbury District)
Angler Lake
Angling Lake
Angood Lake
Angus Lake (Nipissing District)
Angus Lake (Sudbury District)
Angus Lake (Algoma District)
Anibel Lake
Anima Nipissing Lake
Animons Lake
Animoosh Lake
Anishinabi Lake
Anita Lake (Algoma District)
Anita Lake (Manitoba–Ontario)
Anizev Lake
Anjigame Lake
Anjigami Lake
Anjigaming Lake
Ankcorn Lake
Ankrom Lake
Ann Lake (Redditt Township, Kenora District)
Ann Lake (Sudbury District)
Ann Lake (Algoma District)
Ann Lake (Rice Township, Kenora District)
Anna Lake (Ontario)
Anna Lee Lake
Annable Lake
Annas Lake
Anne Lake
Annette Lake (Armistice Creek, Thunder Bay District)
Annette Lake (Greenstone)
Annex Lake (Sudbury District)
Annex Lake (Algoma District)
Annibal Lake
Annie Lake (Halliday Township, Sudbury District)
Annie Lake (Muskoka District)
Annie Lake (Kenora District)
Annie Lake (Killarney)
Annie Lake (Algoma District)
Annies Lake
Annimwash Lake
Annis Lake
Anns Lake
Another Lake
Anrev Lake
Ans Lake
Ansell Lake
Anselmi Lake
Ansig Lake
Anson Lake (Kenora District)
Anson Lake (Haliburton County)
Anstey Lake
Anstruther Lake
Ant Island Lake
Ante Lake
Anteater Lake
Antenna Lake
Anthemis Lake
Anthony Lake
Antler Lake (Brightsand River, Thunder Bay District)
Antler Lake (Sudbury District)
Antler Lake (St. Ignace Island, Thunder Bay District)
Antler Lake (Renfrew County)
Antler Lake (Lahontan Township, Thunder Bay District)
Antler Lake (Meinzinger Township, Thunder Bay District)
Antler Lake (Kenora District)
Antoine Lake (Rainy River District)
Antoine Lake (Algoma District)
Antoine Lake (Frontenac County)
Antoine Lake (Nipissing District)
Anton Lake
Antrim Lake
Anubis Lake
Anvil Lake (Timiskaming District)
Anvil Lake (Algoma District)

Ap
Apex Lake (Timiskaming District)
Apex Lake (Kenora District)
Apisabigo Lake
Apitu Lake
Apollo Lake
Appelle Lake
Appelo Lake
Appendix Lake
Apple Lake (Shawanaga Township, Parry Sound District)
Apple Lake (Nipissing District)
Apple Lake (Whitestone)
Appleby Lake
Applesauce Lake
Apps Lake
April Lake
Apsey Lake
Apsley Lake
Apukwa Lake
Apungsisagen Lake

Aq–Ar
Aquarius Lake
Aquatuk Lake
Aquiline Lake
Ara Lake
Arab Lake
Arabella Lake
Arabi Lake
Aragon Lake
Aralia Lake
Aramis Lake
Arbeesee Lake
Arber Lake
Arbour Lake
Arbuckle Lake
Arbutus Lake (Nipissing District)
Arbutus Lake (Sudbury District)
Arc Lake
Arcand Lake
Archambeau Lake
Archer Lake
Archibald Lake
Archie Lake
Archie's Lake
Archies Lake
Arcol Lake
Arden Lake (Sudbury District)
Arden Lake (Frontenac County)
Ardis Lake
Ardoch Lake
Aremis Lake
Arethusa Lake
Argo Lake (Algoma District)
Argo Lake (Rainy River District)
Argo Lake (Cochrane District)
Argon Lake
Argosy Lake (Kenora District)
Argosy Lake (Algoma District)
Argue Lake (Nipissing District)
Argue Lake (Parry Sound District)
Arguing Lake
Argyle Lake
Arib Lake
Aries Lake
Ariott Lake
Arkon Lake
Arliss Lake
Arlotte Lake
Arm Lake (Comox Township, Sudbury District)
Arm Lake (Thunder Bay District)
Arm Lake (Foy Township, Sudbury District)
Arm Lake (Kenora District)
Armatta Lake
Armer Lake
Armes Lake
Armin Lake
Armishaw Lake
Armistice Lake
Armit Lake
Armitage Lake (Algoma District)
Armitage Lake (Kenora District)
Armitage Lake (Cochrane District)
Armour Lake (Algoma District)
Armour Lake (Armour Creek, Kenora District)
Armour Lake (Mackie Lake, Kenora District)
Arms Lake (Rainy River District)
Arms Lake (Thunder Bay District)
Armstrong Lake (Algoma District)
Armstrong Lake (Totten Township, Sudbury District)
Armstrong Lake (Nickels Lake, Kenora District)
Armstrong Lake (Penhorwood Township, Sudbury District)
Armstrong Lake (Redditt Township, Kenora District)
Armstrong Lake (Thunder Bay District)
Armstrong Lake (Parry Sound District)
Armstrongs Lake
Army Lake (Kenora District)
Army Lake (Algoma District)
Arneil Lake
Arneson Lake
Arnold Lake (Rainy River District)
Arnold Lake (Sudbury District)
Arnot Lake
Arnott Lake (Parry Sound District)
Arnott Lake (Algoma District)
Arnott Lake (Lennox and Addington County)
Arnott Lake (Thunder Bay District)
Arnston Lake
Aronson Lake
Arp Lake
Arpin Lake
Arps Lake
Arran Lake
Arras Lake
Arrell Lake
Arril Lake
Arrow Lake (Cochrane District)
Arrow Lake (Papineau-Cameron)
Arrow Lake (Arrow River, Thunder Bay District)
Arrow Lake (Pentland Township, Nipissing District)
Arrow Lake (Wapikaimaski Lake, Thunder Bay District)
Arrow Lake (Kenora District)
Arrowhead Lake (Muskoka District)
Arrowhead Lake (Algoma District)
Arrowhead Lake (Thunder Bay District)
Arrowhead Lake (Kenora District)
Arrowroot Lake
Arsenic Lake
Art Lake (Rawn Lake, Rainy River District)
Art Lake (Haliburton County)
Art Lake (Atikokan)
Artery Lake
Arthur Lake (Cochrane District)
Arthur Lake (Parry Sound District)
Arthur Lake (Algoma District)
Arthur Lake (Timiskaming District)
Artie Lake
Artist Lake
Arundel Lake
Arva Lake
Aryhart Lake

As
Ascalon Lake
Ash Lake (Marsh Township, Sudbury District)
Ash Lake (Kenora District)
Ash Lake (Rainy River District)
Ash Lake (Yeo Township, Sudbury District)
Ashball Lake
Ashburn Lake
Ashby Lake
Ashby White Lake
Asheigamo Lake
Ashigami Lake
Ashkewe Lake
Ashley Lake
Ashmore Lake (Priske Township, Thunder Bay District)
Ashmore Lake (Greenstone)
Ashton Lake
Asinn Lake
Asio Lake
Asipoquobah Lake
Askwith Lake
Asp Lake
Assapan Lake
Asselin Lake
Assin Lake (Pipestone River, Kenora District)
Assin Lake (Broderick Township, Kenora District)
Assinamish Lake
Assinkepatakiso Lake
Aster Lake
Aster Pond
Aston Lake
Astonish Lake
Astrolabe Lake
Astrop Lake

At
Atekepi Lake
Athelstane Lake
Athlone Lake
Athos Lake
Atigogama Lake
Atik Lake (Kenora District)
Atik Lake (Thunder Bay District)
Atik Lake (Algoma District)
Atikameg Lake (Atikameg Township, Thunder Bay District)
Atikameg Lake (Kenora District)
Atikameg Lake (Danford Township, Thunder Bay District)
Atikamik Lake
Atikasibi Lake
Atikokiwam Lake
Atikomik Lake
Atikwa Lake
Atim Lake
Atkins Lake (Muskoka District)
Atkins Lake (Leeds and Grenville United Counties)
Atkins Lake (Rainy River District)
Atkinson Lake
Atlantic Lake
Atom Lake
Atomic Lake
Attach Lake
Attack Lake
Attawapiskat Lake
Attraction Lake
Attwood Lake
Atwood Lake

Au
Aubin Lake
Aubrey Lake (Aubrey Township, Kenora District)
Aubrey Lake (Algoma District)
Aubrey Lake (Haliburton County)
Aubrey Lake (Benedickson Township, Kenora District)
Auden Lake
Audette Lake
Audrea Lake
Audrey Lake (Fauquier-Strickland)
Audrey Lake (Algoma District)
Audrey Lake (Wacousta Township, Cochrane District)
Auger Lake (Haliburton County)
Auger Lake (Cochrane District)
Auger Lake (Thunder Bay District)
Augite Lake
August Lake (Thunder Bay District)
August Lake (Kenora District)
Augusta Lake (Sudbury District)
Augusta Lake (Thunder Bay District)
Auld Lake (Sudbury District)
Auld Lake (Timiskaming District)
Ault Lake
Aumond Lake
Aura Lee Lake
Aurel Lake
Aurora Lake (Timiskaming District)
Aurora Lake (Nipissing District)
Austen Lake
Austin Lake (Kenora)
Austin Lake (Austin Creek, Kenora District)
Austin Lake (Kehoe Township, Algoma District)
Austin Lake (Corboy Township, Algoma District)
Austin Lake (Sudbury District)
Austin Lake (Haliburton County)
Austins Lake

Av–Az
Ava Lake
Avery Lake (Kenora District)
Avery Lake (Haliburton County)
Avery Lake (Sudbury District)
Avery's Lake
Avey Lake
Avis Lake (Parry Sound District)
Avis Lake (Kenora District)
Avon Lake
Awad Lake
Awameg Lake
Awkward Lake
Awl Lake
Awning Lake
Axe Lake (McEwing Township, Algoma District)
Axe Lake (Renfrew County)
Axe Lake (Redditt Township, Kenora District)
Axe Lake (Thunder Bay District)
Axe Lake (Parry Sound District)
Axe Lake (Sudbury District)
Axe Lake (Gould Township, Algoma District)
Axe Lake (Severn River, Kenora District)
Axle Lake
Axton Lake
Ayah Lake
Aylen Lake
Aylsworth Lake
A.Y. Jackson Lake
Ayotte Lake
Azadi Lake
Azen Lake
Azure Lake (Sudbury District)
Azure Lake (Kenora District)

References
 Geographical Names Data Base, Natural Resources Canada

A